The trutruka (spanish trutruca) is a wind instrument, part of the trumpet family.  It is played mainly amongst the Mapuche of Chile and Argentina. It produces a sound that is loud and severe, with few tonal variations.

Description

The instrument has two main parts, the body and horn. The body is made from Chilean bamboo (Chusquea culeou) and is between 2 and 5 meters long and 2 to 10 cm in diameter. The cane is cut lengthwise into two halves and then lined with string or wire wool and animal gut, usually horse, to prevent air escaping. 

The notes are produced from the variations in the pressure caused by blowing and also by the position of the lips.

See also 
 Alphorn
 Erke

References

Brass instruments